The Chalk Hills Academy (formerly Halyard High School, Barnfield West Academy and West Academy) is a Mixed secondary school and sixth form, part of The Shared Learning Trust located in the west of Luton in Bedfordshire, England.

History
Halyard High School converted to academy status on 1 September 2007 and became part of the Barnfield Federation. A £30m transformation of school buildings, part of Building Schools for the Future programme, was completed in early March 2011. The academy is recognised as being "Good" by Ofsted In its inspection in 2014. In its previous it was rated as "Outstanding".

In 2015 the school split with the Barnfield Federation and is now part The Shared Learning Trust. The school was subsequently renamed West Academy for a short time before being renamed The Chalk Hills Academy in December 2015.

Notable former pupils
Jernade Meade - professional footballer

References

External links 
 

Secondary schools in Luton
Academies in Luton